Ya Tosiba started out as an electronic music duo formed in Finland in 2010, consisting of Norwegian-Azerbaijani singer and producer Zuzu Zakaria and Finnish electronic music producer Tatu Metsätähti (also known as Mesak). Zuzu continues the project as a solo artist.

Their music is a blend of Scandinavian electronic music, Hip hop and classical Arabic, Persian and Turkic music traditions such as Mugam and Ashik.
The texts and poetry used are historical and belong to a genre known as Meykhana. Those were found by Zuzu Zakaria at field-trips to Azerbaijan as a part of her MA Thesis for State University in Oslo. Her master's thesis is the only introductory study in English of the genre existing.

Discography

Studio albums
 2017 Love Party (Asphalt Tango Records)

Collaborations
 2012 Mouse on Mars: Parastrophics (Monkey Town), track 12: Baku Hipster
 2012 Center Of The Universe: Astral Harassment (Metronomicon Audio), track 1: Streelight Interference
 2015 Joxaren: Diir Balek (European Music), track B1: Qurban Gəlir
 2017 Pykäri: Pykäri (Solina Records), track 09: Anlatamıyorum

Remixes
 2016 Racing Heart: What Comes After (Ya Tosiba Remix)

Compilations
 2013 Skweee! (Laton Records), track A3: Anti-futbol (Meykhanacid mix)
 2016 Tribute To Kylmä Sota (Brown Records), track A5: PST
 2016 Metronomicon Audio 7.0 & 8.0 (Metronomicon Audio), track 2-3: Qoçu

Singles and EPs
 2012 Mad Barber (Harmönia)
 2014 Mollah The Machine (Pingipung)
 2014 Mollah The Machine Remixes'' (Pingipung)

References

External links
 Official Site
 

Intelligent dance musicians
Male–female musical duos
Finnish electronic music groups
Electronic music duos
Finnish musical duos